Padi Richo is a politician from the Arunachal Pradesh state in India. He was a member of the Arunachal Pradesh Legislative Assembly from Ziro-Hapoli in the Lower Subansiri district. He belongs to the Indian National Congress. His successor is Tage Taki, who is the MLA from Ziro-Hapoli as of October 2016.

References

People from Ziro
Arunachal Pradesh MLAs 2009–2014